Kabloonak (Inuit for 'White Person', 'non-Inuit') is a Canadian drama film, directed by Claude Massot and released in 1994.

Plot
The film is about the making of Nanook of the North, a 1922 film about an Inuk called Nanook and his family in the Canadian Arctic.

Cast
The film's cast includes Charles Dance as producer and director Robert J. Flaherty, Adamie Inukpuk as Nanook, Bernard Bloch as Thierry Malet, and Natar Ungalaaq as Mukpullu.

Production and release
The film was shot in Siberia and the Northwest Territories.

It premiered at the Montreal World Film Festival in August 1994, and was released theatrically on September 16, 1994 in Canada.

Awards
François Protat received a Genie Award nomination for Best Cinematography at the 15th Genie Awards in 1994 for his work on the film.

Charles Dance won the award for "Best Actor" at the Paris Film Festival 1994 for this film, and Claude Massot was awarded a "Special Jury Prize". At the Montréal World Film Festival 1994, Jacques Loiseleux won for "Best Artistic Contribution", and François Protat for "Photography". At the Gijón International Film Festival 1994, Claude Massot won three awards, for "Best Director", the "Grand Prix Asturias" (for "Best Feature"), and a "Special Prize of the Young Jury".

References

External links 
 
 

1994 films
1994 drama films
Canadian drama films
English-language Canadian films
Films about Inuit in Canada
Films about films
Films shot in the Northwest Territories
Inuit films
1990s English-language films
1990s Canadian films